Alfred Meakin may refer to:

 Alfred Meakin (potter) founder and owner of pottery company
 Alfred Meakin Ltd English pottery manufacturing company, affiliated with J. & G. Meakin
 Alf Meakin (born 1938), British sprinter